Adolf Richard Hölzel (13 May 1853 – 17 October 1934) was a German painter. He began as a Realist, but later became an early promoter of various Modern styles, including Abstractionism.

Biography 
Hölzel was born in Olmütz. His father was the publisher, Eduard Hölzel. In 1868, he completed a three-year apprenticeship as a typesetter at the map publishing firm of F.A.Perthes in Gotha. Three years later, he and his family moved to Vienna where the following year he enrolled at the Academy of Fine Arts, moving to the Academy of Fine Arts, Munich, in 1876, where he studied with Wilhelm von Diez. 

After completing his studies, Hölzel married and divided his time between Munich and Rothenburg ob der Tauber. In Munich, he became acquainted with Fritz von Uhde, who introduced him to Impressionism. Together with Von Uhde, Ludwig Dill and Arthur Langhammer, he helped create an art school, the Dachauer Malschule, in the nearby village of Dachau, which later became the keystone of the famous Dachau art colony. He lived there from 1888 to 1905 and his novel teaching methods drew students from all over Europe. In 1904, he participated in the first exhibition of the Deutscher Künstlerbund.

During his time in Dachau, Hölzel's work began moving toward abstraction, reflecting his interest in such principles as the golden section and Goethe's Theory of Colors. After studying the color theories of Wilhelm von Bezold, he developed his own color theory, based on a circle with "diatonic" and "chromatic" values (terms taken from music). He was involved in creating the Munich Secession and the Vienna Secession. His influential essay "Über Formen und Massenvertheilung" (On Shapes and Mass Distribution), was published in Ver Sacrum. After leaving Dachau, he still returned in the summer months to give private lessons.

In 1905, Hölzel was appointed to replace Leopold von Kalckreuth at the State Academy of Fine Arts in Stuttgart and received commissions on religious themes from the Deutscher Werkbund. Despite abandoning Realism, he still felt that his paintings contained a strong element of religion. Among his students the so-called "Hölzel circle" developed, including Oskar Schlemmer, Willi Baumeister, Max Ackermann, Alf Bayrle and Johannes Itten. He constantly promoted exhibitions of Expressionist art and established a special painting school for women.

Tired of the continuous opposition from his colleagues, Hölzel retired in 1919, but continued to give private lessons and work as a freelance painter. He died in obscurity in 1934, in Stuttgart. His personal papers have been preserved at the Staatsgalerie Stuttgart. In 2005, the non-profit "Adolf Hölzel-Stiftung" was created to preserve and promote his works.

Selected paintings

Footnotes

References

Further reading 
 Marion Ackermann, Gerhard Leistner, Daniel Spanke (Eds.): Kaleidoskop. Hoelzel in der Avantgarde. Kehrer Verlag, Heidelberg 2009, .
 Dörthe Jakobs, Viola Lang: "Das einzige Wandbild von Adolf Hölzel. Der Kruzifixus in der evangelischen Pauluskirche in Ulm." In: Denkmalpflege in Baden-Württemberg. #40, Vol.1 pgs. 45–50 (Online)
 Oliver Jehle: "Über künstlerische Religion. Adolf Hölzels Malerei als spekulative Theologie." In: Christoph Dohmen (Ed.): Religion als Bild – Bild als Religion. Schnell & Steiner, Regensburg 2011 
 Wolfgang Kermer (Ed.): Aus Willi Baumeisters Tagebüchern: Erinnerungen an Otto Meyer-Amden, Adolf Hölzel, Paul Klee, Karl Konrad Düssel und Oskar Schlemmer. Mit ergänzenden Schriften und Briefen von Willi Baumeister. Ostfildern-Ruit: Edition Cantz, 1996 ( / ed. Wolfgang Kermer; 8) .
 Wolfgang Kermer (Ed.): Adolf Hölzel: Einiges über die Farbe in ihrer bildharmonischen Bedeutung und Ausnützung: zur Farbe. Mit einer Einführung von Wolfgang Kermer. Stuttgart: Staatliche Akademie der Bildenden Künste Stuttgart, 1997 ( / [Staatliche Akademie der Bildenden Künste Stuttgart], ed. Wolfgang Kermer; 3)
 Wolfgang Kermer (Ed.): ″Lieber Meister Hölzel...″ (Willi Baumeister): Schüler erinnern sich an ihren Lehrer: zum 70. Geburtstag Adolf Hölzels am 17. Oktober 2004. Mit einem Nachwort des Herausgebers. Staatliche Akademie der Bildenden Künste Stuttgart, 2004 (WerkstattReihe / [Staatliche Akademie der Bildenden Künste Stuttgart],  ed. Wolfgang Kermer; 11) .
 Alexander Klee: Adolf Hölzel und die Wiener Secession. Prestel Verlag, München 2006. .
Karin von Maur: Der verkannte Revolutionär: Adolf Hölzel. Werk und Wirkung. Hohenheim Verlag, Stuttgart 2003 .
 Christoph Wagner, Gerhard Leistner (Eds.): Vision Farbe. Adolf Hölzel und die Moderne. Wilhelm Fink, Paderborn 2015, .

External links 

 Adolf-Hölzel-Stiftung, website home page
 
 ArtNet: More works by Hölzel. 
 
 Adolf Hölzel in the Staatsgalerie Stuttgart

19th-century German painters
German male painters
20th-century German painters
20th-century German male artists
German art educators
Moravian-German people
Artists from Olomouc
Artists from Stuttgart
1853 births
1934 deaths
German abstract artists
19th-century German male artists